Mihaíl Anastasákis (born 3 December 1994) is a Greek track and field athlete specialising in the hammer throw. He finished fourth at the 2016 European Championships.

His personal best in the event is 77.72 metres set in Nikiti in 2017.

International competitions

References

1994 births
Living people
Greek male hammer throwers
Athletes (track and field) at the 2016 Summer Olympics
Olympic athletes of Greece
Athletes (track and field) at the 2020 Summer Olympics
20th-century Greek people
21st-century Greek people